Hermann Abeken (27 June 1820 – 27 April 1854) was a German political writer and statistician. He was the third son of Bernhard Rudolf Abeken.

Abelen was born in Osnabrück, Germany.  He worked as merchant in New York City, but returned to Europe due to a chest affliction. A friend of his brother Friedrich, the young Count  of Görz-Schliz, urged him to begin his law studies in Göttingen and Berlin. Beginning in autumn 1846 he began to write, influenced by his stay in the United States and statistical news.

In the summer of 1848 he was assigned head of the newly inaugurated statistical bureau at the Ministry of Stüve in Hannover. Abelen wrote for the daily press, where he supported the political decisions and goals of the Ministry.  He died in Hannover.

Publications 

 Amerikanische Negersklaverei und Emancipation, 1847
 Die Republik in Nordamerika und der Plan einer demokratisch-republikanischen Verfassung für Deutschland, 1848
 1789. 1848. Mirabeau über das königliche Veto, 1848
 Zur Statistik des Königreichs Hannover, booklets 1–3, 1850-1853
 Der Eintritt der Türkei in die europäische Politik des 18. Jahrhunderts,  1856, published after his death by Carl Bertram Stüve.

Sources

 Allgemeine Deutsche Biographie - online version at Wikisource

External links
 

1820 births
1854 deaths